The New York City Subway is a rapid transit system that serves four of the five boroughs of New York City in the U.S. state of New York: the Bronx, Brooklyn, Manhattan, and Queens. Operated by the New York City Transit Authority under the Metropolitan Transportation Authority of New York, the New York City Subway is the busiest rapid transit system in the United States and the seventh busiest in the world, with 5.225 million daily riders. The system's  stations qualifies it to have the largest number of rapid transit stations in the world.

Three rapid transit companies merged in 1940 to create the present New York City Subway system: the Interborough Rapid Transit Company (IRT), the Brooklyn–Manhattan Transit Corporation (BMT), and the Independent Subway System (IND). All three former systems are present in Manhattan.

History and description
Before subways were built, Manhattan's mass transit system was provided by elevated railways. The first being the West Side and Yonkers Patent Railway which built the IRT Ninth Avenue Line in 1868, and the second being the Gilbert Elevated Railway, which built the IRT Sixth Avenue Line. The WS&YP went bankrupt in 1871 and was replaced by the New York Elevated Railroad, which would later build the IRT Third Avenue Line. The Third Avenue El originally terminated at Grand Central Depot, until it was expanded uptown, transforming the segment into a spur. Meanwhile, the Gilbert El was reorganized as the Metropolitan Elevated Railway and was permitted to build the IRT Second Avenue Line in 1875. All four lines were acquired by the Manhattan Elevated Railway in 1879. They also built a spur from the 3rd and 2nd Avenue lines leading to the East 34th Street Ferry Landing. In 1886, the Suburban Rapid Transit Company extended the Third Avenue El into the Bronx. Manhattan Elevated acquired the SRT in 1891, and the entire railroad was acquired by the Interborough Rapid Transit Company.

An early attempt at a subway system included the Beach Pneumatic Transit Company. The subway was only located in the vicinity of the Rogers Peet Building along Broadway between Warren and Murray Streets. The line had only one car and one station beneath the aforementioned building. With no support for the system from Mayor William Tweed, the line had limited use and ran only between 1870 and 1873 before being abandoned and sealed. The line was rediscovered during construction of the City Hall Station along the BMT Broadway Line in 1912.

The only station in Manhattan not to be used by the IRT or its predecessors was Park Row (BMT station) at the west end of the Brooklyn Bridge which originally served cable cars from the New York and Brooklyn Bridge Railway, and later elevated trains from the Kings County Elevated Railway and Brooklyn Union Elevated Railroad, which were both acquired by the Brooklyn Rapid Transit Company, and later the Brooklyn–Manhattan Transit Corporation. A BMT station also existed on the Manhattan side of the Williamsburg Bridge, but this was exclusively for streetcars.

Interborough Rapid Transit built the first subway in 1904. The line consisted of what is today the IRT Lexington Avenue Line south of 42nd Street, the 42nd Street Shuttle and the IRT Broadway–Seventh Avenue Line between 42nd and 145th Streets. The line was extended less than a month later to 157th Street, and the Lenox Avenue Spur was also built northeast of 96th Street, with its spur to the IRT White Plains Road Line in the Bronx. The line would be expanded again to 221st Street in 1906, and finally Van Cortlandt Park in the Bronx in 1908. In the 1910s and 1920s, the Dual Contracts brought expansion and improvements on subways and els for both the IRT and BRT in four of the five boroughs of the city. In the case of Manhattan, it converted the original line into the "H system" which brought the Broadway-Seventh Avenue Line south of 42nd Street to South Ferry, with a spur to Downtown Brooklyn via the Clark Street Tunnel, and the Lexington Avenue Line north of 42nd Street through 125th Street and the Lexington Avenue Tunnel into the Jerome Avenue and Pelham lines in the Bronx. It also helped extend the IRT Flushing Line to Times Square, created the BMT Nassau Street Line, the BMT Broadway Line, a subway under 14th Street leading to the Canarsie Line in Brooklyn, a spur of the 2nd Avenue el across the Queensboro Bridge into Long Island City, and an extension of the 9th Avenue El between the Polo Grounds via the Putnam Railroad Bridge, leading to the Jerome Avenue Line at 164th Street near Yankee Stadium.

Also during the 1920s, New York City Mayor John Hylan was planning a new city-owned "Independent" Subway System to compete with the IRT and BRT, later BMT. Within Manhattan, the first lines built in the 1930s were the IND Eighth Avenue Line and the IND Sixth Avenue Line, despite the presence of the IRT Sixth Avenue El, and the Hudson and Manhattan Railroad along the same street. Extensions of these lines included the IND Fulton Street Line leading to Brooklyn, IND Queens Boulevard Line leading to Queens, and the IND Concourse Line leading to the Bronx.

Eventually, some growing disdain for the noise of the els, and the fact that the subways were rendering them obsolete lead to their closure. The Sixth Avenue El was closed in 1938, the Second Avenue el closed north of 59th Street in 1940 and north of Chatham Square in 1942. The Ninth Avenue el closed in 1940, except for the segment northeast of 155th Street when it became the southern terminus of the Polo Grounds Shuttle until 1958. The Third Avenue el closed in 1955 but remained opened in the Bronx until 1973. The newest subway lines to be built were the 63rd Street Lines in 1989 to Roosevelt Island and Long Island City, and the western extension of the IRT Flushing Line to 34th Street, near Hudson Yards, on September 13, 2015. The first phase of the IND Second Avenue Line, which was planned as far back as 1919, opened in 2017, with provisions for future expansion south to Hanover Square and north to 125th Street.

Although many east-west numbered streets in Manhattan, as well as Houston Street, are prefixed with either "East" or "West," most subway stations are named without the prefix, i.e. 33rd Street instead of East 33rd Street. The exception is West Fourth Street–Washington Square. The IND had proposed an extension of the Sixth Avenue Line from Second Avenue into Brooklyn. This line would have had a station stop at South Fourth Street in Brooklyn; the station shell was built at the Broadway IND Crosstown Line station and is now sealed up. Thus, West Fourth Street was named to eliminate this confusion should it arose.

Lines and services
There are 151 New York City Subway stations in Manhattan, per the official count of the Metropolitan Transportation Authority (MTA); of these, 32 are express-local stations. If the 18 station complexes are counted as one station each, the number of stations is 121. In the table below, lines with colors next to them indicate trunk lines, which determine the colors that are used for services' route bullets and diamonds. The opening date refers to the opening of the first section of track for the line. In the "division" column, the current division is followed by the original division in parentheses.

Stations
Permanently closed subway stations, including those that have been demolished, are not included in the list below. Numerically named stations that are attached with a geographic location before them (Grand Central–42nd Street, Times Square–42nd Street, Central Park North–110th Street, Harlem–148th Street, Inwood–207th Street, and Marble Hill–225th Street) are listed under the geographic location name.

See also

Notes

References

 
New York City Manhattan
Sub
Manhattan-related lists